was a Japanese politician and gymnast. She competed at the 1960 and 1964 Olympics and won a team bronze medal in 1964.

Early life 
Ono was born on 4 February 1936. Her father died when she was three months old. In 1958, she graduated from the Tokyo University of Education and married Takashi Ono, a fellow Olympic gymnast. They have two sons and three daughters; the first two children were born between 1961 and 1963 while both parents were actively competing.

Athletic career 
Ono represented Japan in gymnastics at the 1960 Olympic Games in Rome and in the 1964 Olympic Games in Tokyo. During the latter competition, the team won the bronze, the only Olympic medal that the Japanese women's gymnastics team had won.

Political career
Ono won the 1986 election and became a member of the House of Councillors for the Liberal Democratic Party between 1986 and 2007. She was a member of the committee on social and labour affairs and the committee on the budget. In 2003, she headed the National Safety Commission, the first woman to hold the position.

Ono was affiliated with the openly revisionist organization Nippon Kaigi.

Later life and death
Ono became the first female vice president of the Japanese Olympic Committee and director of the Japan Sport Council. She worked to create the country's Toto soccer lottery. She was awarded an Olympic Order award from the International Olympic Committee in 2016.

On 13 March 2021, Ono died suddenly of complications from COVID-19 at the age of 85 while she was hospitalized for a bone fracture.

References

External links

1936 births
2021 deaths
Deaths from the COVID-19 pandemic in Japan
Women government ministers of Japan
Female members of the House of Councillors (Japan)
Government ministers of Japan
Members of the House of Councillors (Japan)
Japanese female artistic gymnasts
Members of Nippon Kaigi
Japanese sportsperson-politicians
Olympic gymnasts of Japan
Gymnasts at the 1960 Summer Olympics
Gymnasts at the 1964 Summer Olympics
Olympic bronze medalists for Japan
Medalists at the World Artistic Gymnastics Championships
Sportspeople from Miyagi Prefecture
Politicians from Akita Prefecture
Olympic medalists in gymnastics
University of Tsukuba alumni
Medalists at the 1964 Summer Olympics
Sportspeople from Akita Prefecture